() is generally translated as compassion or mercy and sometimes as self-compassion or spiritual longing. It is a significant spiritual concept in the Indic religions of Hinduism, Buddhism, Sikhism, and Jainism.

Buddhism
 is important in all schools of Buddhism. For Mahāyāna Buddhists,  is a co-requisite for becoming a Bodhisattva.

Theravada Buddhism
In Theravāda Buddhism,  is one of the four "divine abodes" (brahmavihāra), along with loving kindness (Pāli: mettā), sympathetic joy (mudita) and equanimity (upekkha).  In the Pali canon, Gautama Buddha recommends cultivating these four virtuous mental states to both householders and monastics. When one develops these four states, Buddha counsels radiating them in all directions, as in the following stock canonical phrase regarding :

Such a practice purifies one's mind, avoids evil-induced consequences, leads to happiness in one's present life and, if there is a future karmic rebirth, it will be in a heavenly realm.

In the Pāli Canon, Buddhas are also described as choosing to teach "out of compassion for beings."

Mahayana Buddhism
In Mahāyāna Buddhism,  is one of the two qualities, along with enlightened wisdom (Sanskrit: prajña), to be cultivated on the bodhisattva path.

Throughout the Mahāyāna world, Avalokiteśvara (Sanskrit; Chinese: Guan Yin; Japanese: Kannon; Tibetan: Chenrezig) is a bodhisattva who embodies .

In the Intermediate section of the Stages of Meditation by Kamalaśīla, he writes:

In Tibetan Buddhism, one of the foremost authoritative texts on the Bodhisattva path is the Bodhisattvacaryāvatāra by Shantideva. In the eighth section entitled Meditative Concentration, Shantideva describes meditation on Karunā as thus:

Jainism
 is associated with the Jain practice of compassion.  For instance,  is one of the four reflections of universal friendship — along with amity (Sanskrit: maitri), appreciation (pramoda) and equanimity (madhyastha)—used to stop (samvara) the influx of karma.

Miscellaneous
 is a common first name throughout India, used for both genders.

See also
 Adhiṭṭhāna (resolute determination)
 Anapanasati Sutta
 Bodhicitta
 Bodhisattva
 Brahmavihara
 Kayagatasati Sutta
 Life release
 Metta Sutta
 Mudita (appreciative joy)
 Nīlakantha dhāranī
 Metta (loving-kindness)
 Satipatthana Sutta, also called the Four Satipatthanas
 Sukha (happiness)
 Upekkha (equanimity)

Notes

Sources
 Bhikkhu Bodhi (trans.) (2000). The Connected Discourses of the Buddha: A Translation of the Saṃyutta Nikāya. Boston: Wisdom Publications. .
 Buddha Dharma Education Association & BuddhaNet (n.d.). Buddhist Studies for Secondary Students, Unit 6: The Four Immeasurables. Retrieved from "BuddhaNet" at http://www.buddhanet.net/e-learning/buddhism/bs-s15.htm.
 Buddhaghosa, Bhadantacariya & Bhikkhu Ñāṇamoli (trans.) (1999). The Path of Purification: Visuddhimagga. Seattle, WA: BPS Pariyatti Editions. .
 Gethin, Rupert (1998). The Foundations of Buddhism. Oxford: Oxford University Press.
 Monier-Williams, Monier (1899, 1964). A Sanskrit-English Dictionary. London: Oxford University Press. . Retrieved 2008-05-09 from "Cologne University" at http://www.sanskrit-lexicon.uni-koeln.de/scans/MWScan/index.php?sfx=pdf.
 Rhys Davids, T.W. & William Stede (eds.) (1921-5). The Pali Text Society’s Pali–English Dictionary. Chipstead: Pali Text Society. Retrieved 2008-05-09 from "U. Chicago" at http://dsal.uchicago.edu/dictionaries/pali/.
 Saddhatissa, H. (1985/2003) Curzon, London/Humanities Press, New York, 1985
 Salzberg, Sharon (1995). Lovingkindness: The Revolutionary Art of Happiness. Boston: Shambhala Publications. .
 Shah, Pravin K. (n.d.). Nine Tattvas (Principles). Retrieved from "Harvard U." at https://web.archive.org/web/20090605003634/http://www.fas.harvard.edu/~pluralsm/affiliates/jainism/jainedu/9tattva.htm.
 Thanissaro Bhikkhu (trans.) (1994). Kalama Sutta: To the Kalamas (AN 3.65). Retrieved 2008-05-10 from "Access to Insight" at https://web.archive.org/web/20111006181109/http://www.accesstoinsight.org/tipitaka/an/an03/an03.065.than.html.
 Thanissaro Bhikkhu (trans.) (1997). Ayacana Sutta: The Request (SN 6.1). Retrieved 2016-04-30 from "Access to Insight" at http://www.accesstoinsight.org/tipitaka/sn/sn06/sn06.001.than.html.
 Thanissaro Bhikkhu (trans.) (2006). Metta Sutta: Good Will (1) (AN 4.125). Retrieved 2008-05-10 from "Access to Insight" at http://www.accesstoinsight.org/tipitaka/an/an04/an04.125.than.html.
 Warder, A. K. (1970; reprinted 2004). Indian Buddhism. Motilal Banarsidass: Delhi. .

External links
Four Sublime States and The Practice of Loving Kindness by Ñāṇamoli Bhikkhu & Nyanaponika Thera
Don’t Push – Just Use the Weight of Your Own Body by Ajahn Amaro
 Dharma Dictionary - RangjungYesheWiki - Snying Rje / Karuna
 Caring For the Poorest children in Cambodia: Karuna Foundation - by Cathy and Phil Kiely
 The network of Karuna-Shechen foundations in Europe, North America and Asia is raising funds for Karuna-Shechen humanitarian projects in the Himalayan region.
 A View on Buddhism COMPASSION AND BODHICITTA

Wholesome factors in Buddhism
Jain philosophical concepts
Sanskrit words and phrases